The Rhynchogastremaceae are a family of fungi in the order Tremellales. The family currently contains two genera. Some species produce filamentous sexual states with septate basidia and are parasites of other fungi. Most, however, are only known from their yeast states.

References

Tremellomycetes
Basidiomycota families
Taxa described in 1989
Taxa named by Franz Oberwinkler